The National Jewish Commission on Law and Public Affairs (COLPA) is a voluntary association of attorneys whose purpose is to represent the observant Jewish community on legal, legislative, and public-affairs matters.

It was founded by Dr. Marvin Schick in 1965, who served as its first president. Successors to Schick include Howard Rhine
 and Sidney Kwestel Others who have served in that capacity include Julius Berman, Howard J. Zuckerman, and Allen Rothenberg, its current president.

Dennis Rapps is COLPA's Executive Director.

Accomplishments
COLPA has represented, without fee, thousands of individuals and institutions in appearances before Federal and State courts and regulatory agencies throughout the United States  and has made presentations before the Supreme Court of the United States, including by renowned constitutional attorney Nathan Lewin. Sabbath observance in work situations is among the areas they've given assistance.

References

Jewish organizations based in the United States
Legal advocacy organizations in the United States